MetrobusQ or Sistema MetrobusQ (the name is short for Metrobús (de) Quito) is a bus rapid transit system managed by the Empresa Metropolitana de Servicios y Administración del Transporte (EMSAT), the transportation agency of the municipality of the city of Quito, Pichincha Province, Ecuador. It is composed of three subsystems, or three busways:

Trolleybus system ("Trole"), opened in 1995 and subsequently extended.
Articulated bus line ("Ecovía"), opened in 2001.
Articulated bus line ("Metrobus") running through northern and central Quito ("Corredor Central Norte").

External links
"Sistema Convencional de Transporte". Metrobús Quito. Retrieved 2009-03-26. 

Transport in Quito
Bus rapid transit